Resonancia is the twentieth studio album by Japanese singer Akina Nakamori and first studio album to be released during the 2000s. It was released on 22 May 2002 under the Universal Music Japan label. The album includes lead singles "It's Brand New Day" and "The Heat (Musica Fiesta)".

The album includes Akina's original written song Deseo under pseudonym Miran:Miran.

Promotion

Singles
It consists of two previously released singles.

It's Brand New Day is the fortieth single written and arranged by Adya. It was released on 31 May 2001 under indies label "@ease". It was her only single to be released in that year. The single wasn't released as a regular CD, but instead digital single through music service Music Nifty operated by Nifty Corporation. The single was included only in the compilation album Utahime Densetsu: 90's Best. The single was later re-released in the CD format as a live goods in the live tour "All About Akina: 20th Anniversary IT'S BRAND NEW DAY".

The Heat (Musica Fiesta) is the forty-first single written by Adya and Uru. It was released on 5 May 2002, it was her only single to be released in that year. In the media it was promoted as a monthly (May) theme song to the TBS television program Wonderful. The original version of single was included in the compilation album Best Finger 25th anniversary selection and All Time Best: Originals.  The single debuted at number 20 on the Oricon Single Weekly Charts.

Music home video
On 10 July 2002, was released Nakamori's second music home video Apasionado. The disc includes music videoclips of single The Heat: Musica Fiesta and album track Missed U, making footages and interview.

Stage performances
It's Brand New Day has been performed in the anniversary live tour "All About Akina: 20th Anniversary IT'S BRAND NEW DAY".

The album tracks Missed U, Carnaval, Carmesi and The Heat: Musica Fiesta has been performed once in the live tour Music Fiesta Tour in 2002.

Chart performance
The album reached at number 15 on the Oricon Album Weekly Chart charted for the 4 consecutive weeks with the sales of 31,000 copies.

Track listing

References

2002 albums
Japanese-language albums
Akina Nakamori albums
Universal Music Japan albums